Roberto Sánchez Ramos is a Judge of the Court of Appeals of Puerto Rico and  former Attorney General of Puerto Rico, appointed in 2005 by Governor Aníbal Acevedo Vilá. Before becoming Attorney General, Sanchez Ramos served as Solicitor General of Puerto Rico. He is the son of former Governor of Puerto Rico Roberto Sánchez Vilella. His mother, Jeannette Ramos Buonomo, is a retired judge of the Puerto Rico Court of Appeals, and his grandfather was Ernesto Ramos Antonini, who for many years was the Speaker (President) of Puerto Rico's House of Representatives. Also, his aunt was Ivette Ramos Buonomo, a retired professor at University of Puerto Rico's Law School. He was born while his father Roberto Sánchez Vilella was governor of Puerto Rico.

Among his more notable opinions as an appellate judge is a 2016 case in which he overturns a Superior Court decision declaring Puerto Rico's Arms Control Law in violation of the United States Constitution's Second Amendment.

Career and education
After law school, Sanchez Ramos clerked for Justice Federico Hernández Denton of the Supreme Court of Puerto Rico and for Federal Appellate Judge A. Wallace Tashima of the Ninth Circuit.

Education
LL.M., Yale Law School, 1998
J.D., University of Puerto Rico Law School, 1993
B.S., Massachusetts Institute of Technology, 1989

External links
Puerto Rico Department of Justice website 

Living people
1960s births
Puerto Rican lawyers
University of Puerto Rico alumni
Massachusetts Institute of Technology alumni
Secretaries of Justice of Puerto Rico
Yale University alumni